Dysstroma sobria, the 10-spotted rhododendron moth, is a species of geometrid moth in the family Geometridae. It is found in North America.

The MONA or Hodges number for Dysstroma sobria is 7184.

References

Further reading

External links

 

Hydriomenini
Articles created by Qbugbot
Moths described in 1917